The Zürich Islamic center shooting refers to the mass shooting of several people in an Islamic center in Central Zürich that occurred on 19 December 2016. The assailant was later identified as a 24-year-old Swiss man of Ghanaian descent living in Uster District. While the motive is still under investigation, the Islamic Central Council of Switzerland and others claim the attacker was motivated by anti-Muslim sentiment.

Dead body in Schwamendingen
At approximately 9 AM on 18 December 2016, a dead stabbing victim was discovered on a playground in the Schwamendingen district of Zürich.  The victim was a 25-year-old Swiss citizen of Chilean origin whose name has been withheld.   The police identified a suspect in the murder based on DNA evidence at the scene and began searching for the assailant.  The suspect's DNA was in a police database due to an arrest seven years prior for stealing a bicycle, and he was known to be a former friend of the murder victim.

Shooting
At approximately 5:30 PM on 19 December 2016, a man entered an Islamic center near the main train station in Zürich and began shooting, apparently at random.  The center, which is primarily used by refugees from Somalia and Eritrea, was hosting prayer services at the time.  Approximately 10 people were present at the shooting.  Three people were wounded in the attack, two seriously, though all are expected to survive.  The victims are two Somali nationals, age 30 and 35, and a Swiss citizen age 56.  One witness reported hearing the shooter yell "Raus aus unserem Land [Get out of our country]", though police could not confirm this.

After the shooting, the suspect fled the area on foot and a police manhunt was started to locate and capture him. Police brought in dog tracking teams to attempt to locate the suspect, and alerted the public to be wary. It was subsequently discovered that the suspect apparently killed himself with a self-inflicted gunshot.

Perpetrator 
The man responsible for the murder and subsequent shooting was identified as a 24-year-old Swiss citizen of Ghanaian descent living in Uster.  As of December 21, his name has not been released by police.  He lived alone and had quit his job at a local store on the Friday prior to the shooting.  The gun used in the shooting was legally registered to the assailant.

Police indicate that there was no evidence that the suspect was connected to either Islamist or right-wing extremists.  The gunman has no known connection to the Islamic center that he targeted nor any of the victims there.  Evidence in the suspect's apartment indicated he had a substantial interest in occult practices, but the motivation for both the stabbing death and subsequent shooting was unclear.  Other than the stolen bicycle many years ago, there was no additional police record regarding the suspect prior to these crimes.

Reaction
As the shooting at the Islamic center occurred on the same day as the assassination of Andrei Karlov and the 2016 Berlin truck attack, there was initially fear that the events might be related.  American President-elect Donald Trump called all three events "terror attacks" and said that "the civilized world must change thinking".

The Islamic Central Council of Switzerland, a fundamental Islamic organisation which is under surveillance of the Swiss intelligence agencies, issued a statement condemning the attack and suggesting it should serve as an "alarm" regarding the threat posed by increasing Islamophobia in Swiss society.  They encouraged mosques and Islamic institutions to be vigilant against the threat of violence and called on federal and cantonal authorities to guarantee the security of Switzerland's Muslim minority.  They also directed criticism at the anti-Islamic attitudes expressed by politicians from the right-wing Swiss People's Party (SVP).

References

Anti-Muslim violence in Europe
2016 in Switzerland
21st century in Zürich
December 2016 crimes in Europe
December 2016 events in Europe
Murder in Switzerland
Murder–suicides in Europe
Violence against Muslims
Attacks on mosques
Persecution of Muslims
Terrorist incidents in Switzerland
2016 murders in Switzerland
Mass shootings in Switzerland
2016 mass shootings in Europe